GBO may refer to:

 Game Boy Original, a Nintendo handheld game console
 Gbo language (ISO 639-3: agb), a Cross River language of Nigeria
 Get Britain Out, a British Eurosceptic organisation
 The Graham Bond Organisation, a British music group
 Green Bank Observatory, a radio astronomy observatory in Green Bank, West Virginia
 Northern Grebo language (ISO 639-3: gbo), a Kru language of Liberia